The 2020 Louisiana Ragin' Cajuns softball team represented the University of Louisiana at Lafayette in the 2020 NCAA Division I softball season. The Ragin' Cajuns played their home games at Yvette Girouard Field at Lamson Park. The Cajuns were led by third year head coach Gerry Glasco.

On March 12, the Sun Belt Conference announced the indefinite suspension of all spring athletics, including softball, due to the increasing risk of the COVID-19 pandemic.  On March 13, Louisiana governor John Bel Edwards signed an executive order banning gatherings of over 250 people until as early as April 18, thus ending all possible future 2020 home or in-state games until that time if the season were to restart.  On March 16, the Sun Belt formally announced the cancelation of all spring sports, thus ending their season definitely.

The Cajuns finished the abbreviated season 1st in the only-released RPI in the NCAA, thus making them the claimed "RPI National Champions".

Preseason

Sun Belt Conference Coaches Poll
The Sun Belt Conference Coaches Poll was released on January 29, 2020. Louisiana was picked to finish first in the Sun Belt Conference with 100 votes and 10 first place votes, all first place votes available.

Preseason All-Sun Belt team
Summer Ellyson (LA, SR, Pitcher)
Megan Kleist (LA, SR, Pitcher)
Julie Rawls (LA, SR, Catcher)
Reagan Wright (UTA, SR, Catcher)
Katie Webb (TROY, SR, 1st Base)
Kaitlyn Alderink (LA, SR, 2nd Base)
Hailey Mackay (TXST, SR, 3rd Base)
Alissa Dalton (LA, SR, Shortstop)
Jayden Mount (ULM, SR, Shortstop)
Whitney Walton (UTA, SR, Shortstop)
Tara Oltmann (TXST, JR, Shortstop)
Courtney Dean (CCU, JR, Outfield)
Mekhia Freeman (GASO, SR, Outfield)
Sarah Hudek (LA, SR, Outfield)
Raina O'Neal (LA, JR, Outfield)
Bailey Curry (LA, JR, Designated Player/1st Base)

Sun Belt Conference Preseason Player of the Year
Alissa Dalton (LA, SR, Shortstop)

Sun Belt Conference Preseason Pitcher of the Year
Summer Ellyson (LA, SR, Pitcher)

National Softball Signing Day

Roster

Coaching staff

Schedule and results

Schedule Source:
*Rankings are based on the team's current ranking in the NFCA/USA Softball poll.

Rankings

References

Louisiana
Louisiana Ragin' Cajuns softball seasons
Louisiana Ragin' Cajuns softball